Dar Tut or Dar-e Tut or Dartut may refer to:
 Dar Tut, Ilam
 Dartut, Shirvan and Chardaval, Ilam Province
 Dartut, Kermanshah
 Dartut-e Movvali, Kermanshah Province
 Dartut-e Rahim, Kermanshah Province
 Dar Tut, Kurdistan
 Dar Tut, Lorestan
 Dartut, Lorestan